South Barrington is a residential suburb in Cook County, Illinois, United States, south of Barrington. Per the 2020 census, the population was 5,077. South Barrington is a wealthy suburb of Chicago. It is the location of the famous megachurch Willow Creek Community Church, Goebbert's Pumpkin Patch and Farm, and a lifestyle center (shopping center) named The Arboretum of South Barrington.

Geography
South Barrington is located at  (42.084226, -88.15478).

Demographics
As of the 2020 census there were 5,077 people, 1,534 households, and 1,447 families residing in the village. The racial makeup of the village was 53.20% White, 40.20% Asian, 0.77% African American, 0.12% Native American, 0.55% from other races, and 5.16% from two or more races. Hispanic or Latino of any race were 3.17% of the population.

There were 1,534 households, out of which 89.37% had children under the age of 18 living with them, 86.64% were married couples living together, 5.87% had a female householder with no husband present, and 5.67% were non-families. 2.74% of all households were made up of individuals, and 1.76% had someone living alone who was 65 years of age or older. The average household size was 3.28 and the average family size was 3.24.

The village's age distribution consisted of 28.7% under the age of 18, 4.6% from 18 to 24, 11.7% from 25 to 44, 36.1% from 45 to 64, and 18.8% who were 65 years of age or older. The median age was 48.5 years. For every 100 females, there were 98.8 males. For every 100 females age 18 and over, there were 103.0 males.

The median income for a household in the village was $183,750, and the median income for a family was $188,496. Males had a median income of $128,277 versus $58,750 for females. The per capita income for the village was $71,005. About 0.8% of families and 1.7% of the population were below the poverty line, including 0.0% of those under age 18 and 2.9% of those age 65 or over.

Note: the US Census treats Hispanic/Latino as an ethnic category. This table excludes Latinos from the racial categories and assigns them to a separate category. Hispanics/Latinos can be of any race.

Education

Most of South Barrington's zoned public schools are in Barrington District 220. The schools in this district that are assigned to homes in the village are:

 Barbara B Rose Elementary School (K-5)
 Grove Avenue Elementary School (K-5)
 Countryside Elementary School (K-5)
 Barrington Middle School Prairie Campus (6-8)
 Barrington Middle School Station Campus (6-8)
 Barrington High School (9-12)

A small portion of the village is served by Thomas Jefferson Elementary School (K-6) in nearby Hoffman Estates, Carl Sandburg Junior High School (7-8) in Rolling Meadows, both of District 15, and William Fremd High School (9-12; Township High School District 211) in Palatine. Another small portion of South Barrington is served by District 300, specifically Parkview Elementary School, Carpentersville Middle School, and Dundee Crown High School. These three schools are located in Carpentersville, Illinois.

Notable people 

 Craig Anderson, goaltender for the Colorado Avalanche and Ottawa Senators
 Paul Bragiel, Colombian National Team cross-country skier, venture capitalist
Gregory Dickow, megachurch pastor and founder of Life Changers International Church
 Mike Magee, forward with the Chicago Fire Soccer Club
 Walter Payton, Hall of Fame running back with the Chicago Bears
 Mike Singletary, Hall of Fame linebacker and coach with several NFL teams

References

External links

Village of South Barrington official website
South Barrington, IL, Encyclopedia of Chicago
Barrington Area Library

Villages in Illinois
Villages in Cook County, Illinois
Chicago metropolitan area
Populated places established in 1959
1959 establishments in Illinois